The Northern Sulawesi echiothrix or Sulawesi spiny rat (Echiothrix leucura) is a species of rodent in the family Muridae.
It is endemic to northeastern Sulawesi, Indonesia.

References

Rats of Asia
Rodents of Sulawesi
Endemic fauna of Indonesia
Endangered fauna of Asia
Mammals described in 1867
Taxonomy articles created by Polbot
Echiothrix